Joseph Thomas O'Keefe (March 12, 1919 – September 2, 1997) was an American prelate of the Roman Catholic Church who served as Bishop of Syracuse from 1987 to 1995.

Biography
Joseph O'Keefe was born in New York City to Michael and Bridget (née O'Sullivan) O'Keefe. He was ordained to the priesthood for the Archdiocese of New York on April 17, 1948. During his priestly ministry, he served as a curate at St. Luke's Church and biology instructor and dean at Cardinal Hayes High School in The Bronx. He also taught biology at Mercy College in Dobbs Ferry and at St. Joseph Seminary in Yonkers. He was Secretary for Education and associate superintendent of Catholic schools in the Archdiocese, chancellor and vicar general, and pastor of St. John the Evangelist Church in Manhattan.

On July 3, 1982, O'Keefe was appointed Auxiliary Bishop of New York and Titular Bishop of Tres Tabernae by Pope John Paul II. He received his episcopal consecration on the following September 8 from Cardinal Terence Cooke, with Archbishop John Joseph Maguire and Bishop Harold Robert Perry, S.V.D., serving as co-consecrators, at St. Patrick's Cathedral.

Upon the resignation of Bishop Francis James Harrison, O'Keefe was named the eighth Bishop of Syracuse on June 16, 1987. He was installed at the Cathedral of the Immaculate Conception on the following August 3. After reaching the mandatory retirement age of 75, he resigned as bishop on April 4, 1995.

O'Keefe died from heart failure at St. Joseph's Hospital Health Center, Syracuse, New York, aged 78.

References

1919 births
1997 deaths
Clergy from New York City
20th-century Roman Catholic bishops in the United States
Mercy College (New York) faculty
Roman Catholic bishops of Syracuse